Zemun is a Russian mystical neo-Western film directed by Eduard Zholnin. This film was theatrically released on November 10, 2022.

Plot 
Yegor's father has been mysteriously murdered, causing Yegor to travel to the village where he was born to try to talk his brother into selling his father's inheritance as soon as possible. But, having arrived in the village, Yegor begins to understand that he, his brother and the inheritance are in great danger.

Cast 
 Yevgeny Tkachuk as Yegor
 Ivan Rashetnyak as Pashka
 Oleg Yagodin as Gleb
 Ekaterina Shumakova
 Andrey Ilyin
 Vyacheslav Garder as Vlas
 Anatoliy Dubanov
 Nikita Kostyukevich

References

External links 
 

2022 films
2022 Western (genre) films
2022 thriller drama films
2020s speculative fiction films
2020s Russian-language films
Russian thriller drama films
Russian speculative fiction films